Tauer is a surname of German origin. Notable people with the surname include:

Ewald Tauer (born 1941), German wrestler
Jan Tauer (born 1983), German footballer
Paul Tauer, American politician

References

Surnames of German origin